The Women's time trial of the 2008 UCI Road World Championships cycling event took place on 24 September in Varese, Italy.

After finishing one place out of the medals in last World Championships, Amber Neben became gold medal winner, recording a time 7 seconds quicker than Austria's Christiane Soeder with Germany's Judith Arndt finishing behind Soeder in third.

Route
The course covered 25.2 km.

Qualification

All National Federations were allowed to enter four riders for the race, with a maximum of two riders to start. In addition to this number, the outgoing World Champion and the current continental champions were also able to take part.

Final classification

References

Women's time trial
UCI Road World Championships – Women's time trial
2008 in women's road cycling